This is a list of members of the Western Australian Legislative Council from 22 May 1983 to 21 May 1986. The chamber had 34 seats made up of 17 provinces each electing two members, on a system of rotation whereby one-half of the members would retire at each triennial election.

Notes
 On 4 August 1984, Central Province Liberal MLC Gordon Atkinson died. National candidate Eric Charlton won the resulting by-election on 17 November 1984.

Sources
 
 
 

Members of Western Australian parliaments by term